Boris Chindykov (born August 1, 1960, vil. Balday, Chuvash ASSR, USSR) - Chuvash playwright, novelist, poet, essayist, translator.

Member of  the Writers' Union of USSR (1990). Laureate of the State Prize of the Chuvash Republic in the field of literature and art. (1993, "Blackberries along the fence"

Biography 
Born in Aug. 1, 1960 in the village Balday (Yadrinsky District, Chuvash Republic).

In 1984 he graduated from the Moscow Maxim Gorky Literature Institute.

In 1985-1988 - Literary adviser of the Union of Writers of the Chuvash Republic, both supervisor department of literary criticism and journalism magazine "Tӑvan Atӑl)." In 1994-1997. chief editor of "The Face of Chuvashia."

He publish a newspaper "Avan-i" (1990-1993) And "Advertisements and announcements" (1992-1993, now "Express Mail", Cheboksary).

In 1996–2007 years he worked in Moscow in the Turkish travel agencies as translator, advertising manager and director.

In March and October 2009, he worked as chief-editor "Tăvan en" / Native Land, edition of "TE" of the local newspaper picked up the Republican "Shupashkar en haçachĕ" / Newspaper Cheboksary region, began to produce an annex to the main edition - "Pricheboksare" (in Russian).

Translated by different authors with the Chuvash and Turkish to Russian, also from English, Russian, Turkish languages into Chuvash.

Works

Books 
 «Чӳк уйăхĕ» («November», novels, 1987);
 «Çурçĕр хыççăнхи апатлану» («Dinner after midnight», drama, 1992);
 «Urazmet» (tragedy, 1993);
 «Çатан карта çинчи хура хăмла çырли» («Blackberries along the fence», play, 1995);
 «Хура чĕкеç» («Black swallow» monodrama, 2003);
 «Шведский стол» (Smorgasbord, drama, 2003);

Drama 
 «Алăксем умĕнче» (At the doors, 1995);
 «Çĕр хăйăрĕн тусанĕ» (Sand dust, 1981);
 «Хупланнă тĕкĕрсем» (Closed mirrors, 1997;
 «Урасмет» (Urazmet)
 «Масаркасси ясарĕн çитмĕл çиччĕмĕш матки» (Seventy-seventh wife of a libertine from Masarkassi, song and dance striptease farce)
 «Сарă хĕр Нарспи» («Beauty Narspy», the libretto for the musical)

Novels 
 «Ăçта каян, чĕкеç…» (Where do you fly, swallow)
 «Hotel Chuvashia»
 «Нараста» (Narasta, 1990);
 «Пуçăм ыратать» (Head hurts, 1988);
 «Бобби» (Bobby, 1988);
 «Тухса кайиччен» (Before leaving, 1988);
 «Хутлă канфет» (Sweets in wrapper, 1988);
 «Йĕпхӳ» (Drizzle);
 «Элчел: love story» (1982);
 «Кĕлчечек» (Roses for Romeo, 1983)

Publicism

Translations into Chuvash

Translations from Chuvash into Russian 
 Юрий Скворцов: «Aughakhve’s birch», story.
 Хветĕр Уяр: «Belated rain», novella.
 Александр Артемьев: «Waste», story.

The texts of popular songs 
 «Пĕчĕк тăлăх хĕрачам» (Little orphan)
 «Пĕчĕк калаçу» (Short talking)
 «Пукане» (Puppet)
 «Йăнăш ăнлантăн» (I haven’t understand)
 «Эпĕ шутланăччĕ» (I supoused)
 «Амăшĕсем» (Our mothers)

In Russian 
 «Blackberries along the fence», drama, 1994;
 «Dinner after midnight», drama, 1992)
 «Smorgasbord», play, 1996);
 «The king's garden», children's play, 1996);
 «Essays», 1997);
 «Khan’s return», story, 2000).

References

External links 
 Famous people of the Yadrin earth
  50 years since the birth of Boris Chindykov (1960)

Russian writers
Russian male poets
Chuvash writers
Chuvash-language poets
1960 births
Living people
Maxim Gorky Literature Institute alumni